Ramla is a town and commune in Relizane Province, Algeria.

See also
 Ramka District

References

Communes of Relizane Province
Cities in Algeria
Algeria